Ahmed Kebaili (21 February 1925 – 8 September 2013) was an Algerian racing cyclist. He rode in the 1950 Tour de France.

References

External links
 

1925 births
2013 deaths
Algerian male cyclists
Place of birth missing
21st-century Algerian people